Choi Ye-won (born June 18, 1999), known professionally as Arin, is a South Korean singer and actress. She is a member of South Korean girl group Oh My Girl.

Early life
Arin attended Dongduk Middle School and School of Performing Arts Seoul.

Career

2015–2019: Debut with Oh My Girl and other activities

On April 20, 2015, Arin debuted as a member of Oh My Girl. She first performed their debut single on SBS MTV's The Show on April 21. On April 2, 2018, Arin debuted in Oh My Girl's first sub-unit, Oh My Girl Banhana. On September 7, 2019, it was announced that Arin would be appearing on XtvN's The Ultimate Watchlist 2. In August 2019, it was confirmed that Arin would be taking part in Queendom.

2020–present: Solo activities
On March 10, 2020, Arin was cast as Oh Na-ri in Naver TV's web series The World of My 17.

On July 20, 2020, Arin was announced as the new host for Music Bank with Choi Soo-bin of TXT. Their last broadcast from the role was on October 1, 2021.

In March 2021, it was announced that Arin was cast in Netflix's series Ghost Story 2.

In June 2022, she was cast in a supporting role in the tvN hit fantasy period drama Alchemy of Souls.

Philanthropy
In December 2020, Arin secretly donated  million to her hometown Busan Elderly Welfare Center.

On June 18, 2021, it was announced that Arin donated  million to The Beautiful Foundation in honor of her 22nd birthday. Her donations will be used for supporting young adults who are living alone and have been discharged from child care facilities and foster care.

On May 16, 2022, Arin donated  to The Beautiful Foundation on Coming-of-Age Day.

On August 11, 2022, Arin donated  to help those affected by the 2022 South Korean floods through the Hope Bridge Korea Disaster Relief Association.

On December 2022 Arin donated 25,000 bricks worth  million to Busan Briquette Bank on December 5th.

Endorsements
On March 5, 2020, Arin became the brand model for South Korean clothing brand BYC.

Discography

Filmography

Film

Television series

Web series

Television show

Hosting

Awards and nominations

Notes

References

External links

 Arin on Instagram

1999 births
Living people
South Korean female idols
South Korean web series actresses
South Korean television actresses
People from Busan
Musicians from Busan
WM Entertainment artists
Oh My Girl members
School of Performing Arts Seoul alumni